Emil Wahlström (born 2 March 1987) is a Swedish footballer who plays as a centre-back.

Honours

BK Häcken
Svenska Cupen: 2015–16

References

External links

1987 births
Living people
Association football defenders
Hisingsbacka FC players
BK Häcken players
GAIS players
Allsvenskan players
Superettan players
Swedish footballers
Sweden youth international footballers